Dhawee Umponmaha (born November 15, 1959 in Amphoe Mueang Rayong, Rayong province) or known in Muay Thai as Kaopong Sitichuchai (ขาวผ่อง สิทธิชูชัย) is a Thai boxer. At the 1984 Summer Olympics he won a silver medal in the men's Light Welterweight (64 kg or 141 lb) category. He was the second Thai athlete to win a medal at the Summer Olympics, following Payao Poontarat at the 1976 Summer Olympics.

Biography

Early life and Muay Thai career
He is the third of six children. He started fighting at the age of 14 in his native province with Chucheep Chaimongkol as a trainer. In 1974, he traveled to Bangkok to fight for the first time at the major stadiums, Rajadamnern Stadium and Lumpinee Stadium. He won the Featherweight (57 kg or 126 lb) title of the Lumpinee Stadium and defended it for four years. He vacated the title to move up to a heavier division. He knocked out the legendary Dieselnoi Chor Thanasukarn.

Boxing
He then turned to amateur boxing due to Capt. Chanai Pongsupa's persuasion (Torsak Sasiprapa's father), training at Osotspa Club from 1981. He laso made the transition because he wanted to travel abroad. He was successful in many competitions such as the Thailand Championships which he won in 1983 and 1984, he obtained a silver medal in the 1982 Asian Games, a silver medal in the 1982 King's Cup and the gold medal in the 1983 Southeast Asian Games.

Retirement
After retirement, he worked as a public relations officer for Osotspa and as a secretary of Osotspa F.C. (currently Super Power Samut Prakan F.C.) in Thai Premier League. He also has his own cosmetic business.

1984 Olympic results 
 Round of 64: Defeated Jaslal Pradhan (India) by decision, 5-0
 Round of 32: Defeated Charles Owiso (Kenya) by decision, 3-2
 Round of 16: Defeated Dave Griffiths (Great Britain) by decision, 4-1
 Quarterfinal: Defeated Jorge Maysonet (Puerto Rico) by decision, 5-0
 Semifinal: Defeated Mircea Fulger (Romania) by decision, 5-0
 Final: Lost to Jerry Page (United States) by decision, 0-5 (was awarded silver medal)

Titles and accomplishments
Lumpinee Stadium
 1978 Lumpinee Stadium 126 lbs champion
World Free-style Martial Arts
 WFMA 147 lbs Champion

Muay Thai record

|-  style="background:#cfc;"
| 1984-01-05|| Win||align=left| Krongsak Sakkasem ||  Rajadamnern Stadium|| Bangkok, Thailand || Decision || 5|| 3:00  
|-  style="background:#cfc;"
| 1983-11-03 || Win||align=left| Jitti Kiatsuriya || Rajadamnern Stadium || Bangkok, Thailand || Decision || 5 || 3:00
|-  style="background:#;"
| 1983-04-23 || ||align=left| Dave Johnston || || Los Angeles, United States || ||  || 
|-  style="background:#cfc;"
| 1983-02-17 || Win||align=left| Fanta Attapong|| Rajadamnern Stadium || Bangkok, Thailand || TKO || 3 ||

|-  style="background:#fbb;"
| 1982-12-27 || Loss||align=left| Samart Prasarnmit || Rajadamnern Stadium|| Bangkok, Thailand || Decision || 5 || 3:00

|-  style="background:#cfc;"
| 1982-11-15 || Win||align=left| Jitti Kiatsuriya || Lumpinee Stadium || Bangkok, Thailand || Decision || 5 || 3:00

|-  style="background:#cfc;"
| 1982-04-28 || Win||align=left| Seichi Nanjo || Rajadamnern Stadium - Chakri Dynasty Bicentenary || Bangkok, Thailand || KO (Punch) || 1||1:15 
|-
! style=background:white colspan=9 |

|-  style="background:#fbb;"
| 1982-02-05 || Loss||align=left| Pannoi Sakornphithak || Lumpinee Stadium || Bangkok, Thailand || Decision || 5 || 3:00
|-  style="background:#cfc;"
| 1981-09-22 || Win||align=left| Sagat Petchyindee || Lumpinee Stadium || Bangkok, Thailand || TKO (Punches)|| 4 ||

|-  style="background:#fbb;"
| 1981-07-02 || Loss||align=left| Nongkhai Sor.Prapatsorn || Rajadamnern Stadium || Bangkok, Thailand || Decision || 5 ||3:00
|-  style="background:#cfc;"
| 1981-05-14 || Win||align=left| Padejsuk Pitsanurachan || Rajadamnern Stadium || Bangkok, Thailand || Decision || 5 || 3:00

|-  style="background:#cfc;"
| 1981-03-19 || Win||align=left| Lakchart Sor.Prasartporn || Lumpinee Stadium || Bangkok, Thailand || KO|| 4 ||

|-  style="background:#fbb;"
| 1981-02- || Loss||align=left| Seksan Sor.Theppitak || || Bangkok, Thailand || Decision || 5|| 3:00  
|-  style="background:#fbb;"
| 1981-01-09 || Loss||align=left| Dieselnoi Chor Thanasukarn || Lumpinee Stadium || Bangkok, Thailand || Decision || 5|| 3:00  
|-
! style=background:white colspan=9 |
|-  style="background:#fbb;"
| 1980-11-07 || Loss||align=left| Nongkhai Sor.Prapatsorn || Lumpinee Stadium || Bangkok, Thailand || Decision || 5|| 3:00
|-  style="background:#cfc;"
| 1980-09-26 || Win||align=left| Dieselnoi Chor Thanasukarn || Lumpinee Stadium || Bangkok, Thailand || KO (Punches)|| 2 ||

|-  style="background:#cfc;"
| 1980-08-08 || Win||align=left| Padejsuk Pitsanurachan || Lumpinee Stadium || Bangkok, Thailand || Decision || 5 || 3:00
|-  style="background:#fbb;"
| 1980-07-08 || Loss ||align=left| Dieselnoi Chor Thanasukarn || Lumpinee Stadium || Bangkok, Thailand || KO (Knee to the head)|| 3 ||
|-
! style=background:white colspan=9 |
|-  style="background:#cfc;"
| 1980-05-03 || Win||align=left| Vicharnnoi Porntawee||  || Rayong Province, Thailand || TKO || 2 || 
|-  style="background:#cfc;"
| 1980-03-05 || Win||align=left| Narongnoi Kiatbandit || Rajadamnern Stadium || Bangkok, Thailand || Decision || 5 || 3:00
|-  style="background:#cfc;"
| 1980-01-22 || Win||align=left| Raktae Muangsurin || Lumpinee Stadium || Bangkok, Thailand || TKO|| 3 ||
|-  style="background:#cfc;"
| 1979-12-07 || Win||align=left| Nortsila Lukbankhod || Lumpinee Stadium || Bangkok, Thailand || Decision || 5 || 3:00

|-  style="background:#fbb;"
| 1979-08-31 || Loss ||align=left| Kamlaiyok Kiatsompop ||  || Bangkok, Thailand || Decision|| 5||3:00

|-  style="background:#cfc;"
| 1979-07-27 || Win ||align=left| Jitti Muangkhonkaen || Lumpinee Stadium || Bangkok, Thailand || Decision|| 5||3:00

|-  style="background:#fbb;"
| 1979-05-25 || Loss||align=left| Ruengsak Porntawee || Lumpinee Stadium || Bangkok, Thailand || Decision || 5||3:00

|-  style="background:#cfc;"
| 1979-04-03 || Win ||align=left| Jocky Sitkanpai || Lumpinee Stadium || Bangkok, Thailand || Decision || 5 || 3:00

|-  style="background:#cfc;"
| 1979-03-03 || Win||align=left| Pudpadnoi Worawut || Lumpinee Stadium || Bangkok, Thailand || Decision || 5|| 3:00

|-  style="background:#cfc;"
| 1979-02-13 || Win||align=left| Fahkaew Fairtex || Lumpinee Stadium || Bangkok, Thailand || Decision || 5|| 3:00

|-  style="background:#fbb;"
| 1979-01-17 || Loss||align=left| Nongkhai Sor.Prapatsorn || Lumpinee Stadium || Bangkok, Thailand || Decision || 5|| 3:00

|-  style="background:#cfc;"
| 1978-12-14 || Win||align=left| Maen Sahathai|| Lumpinee Stadium || Bangkok, Thailand || Decision || 5|| 3:00

|-  style="background:#fbb;"
| 1978-10-10 || Loss ||align=left| Sagat Petchyindee || Lumpinee Stadium || Bangkok, Thailand || KO (Punches)|| 4 ||
|-  style="background:#cfc;"
| 1978-08-11 || Win ||align=left| Ruengsak Porntawee || Lumpinee Stadium || Bangkok, Thailand || Decision || 5|| 3:00  
|-
! style=background:white colspan=9 |
|-  style="background:#cfc;"
| 1978-06-13 || Win||align=left| Nanfah Siharatdecho || Lumpinee Stadium || Bangkok, Thailand || KO || 4||

|-  style="background:#cfc;"
| 1978-04-06 || Win||align=left| Saengsakda Kittikasem || Lumpinee Stadium || Hat Yai, Thailand || Decision || 5|| 3:00

|-  style="background:#cfc;"
| 1978-03-13 || Win||align=left| Yodchat Sor Jitpattana || Lumpinee Stadium || Bangkok, Thailand || Decision || 5|| 3:00 
|-  style="background:#cfc;"
| 1978-02-16 || Win||align=left| Saksakon Sakthanin || Lumpinee Stadium || Bangkok, Thailand || Decision || 5|| 3:00

|-  style="background:#cfc;"
| 1977-01-25 || Win||align=left| Sirichai Singnarai || Lumpinee Stadium || Bangkok, Thailand || Decision || 5|| 3:00
|-  style="background:#cfc;"
| 1976-10-05 || Win||align=left| Samingdam Thanasarntransport || Lumpinee Stadium || Bangkok, Thailand || Decision || 5|| 3:00
|-  style="background:#fbb;"
| 1976-08-31 || Loss||align=left| Chanchai Petchphotharam || Lumpinee Stadium || Bangkok, Thailand || Decision || 5|| 3:00  
|-  style="background:#fbb;"
| 1976-01-21 || Loss||align=left| Sagat Petchyindee || || Rayong, Thailand || Decision || 5 || 3:00
|-
| colspan=9 | Legend:

References

External links
 

1959 births
Living people
Dhawee Umponmaha
Boxers at the 1984 Summer Olympics
Dhawee Umponmaha
Olympic medalists in boxing
Asian Games medalists in boxing
Dhawee Umponmaha
Boxers at the 1982 Asian Games
Dhawee Umponmaha
Dhawee Umponmaha
Medalists at the 1984 Summer Olympics
Featherweight kickboxers
Dhawee Umponmaha
Medalists at the 1982 Asian Games
Southeast Asian Games medalists in boxing
Dhawee Umponmaha
Light-welterweight boxers